La Caja Mágica (also known as the Manzanares Park Tennis Center) is a multi-purpose stadium located in Madrid, Spain. Since 2009, it has been the home of the Madrid Open tennis event, and as of 2019, the home of the Davis Cup.

There are three courts under the one structure, and a series of retractable roofs. The seating capacity of Courts 1 and 2 would have been increased if Madrid's bid for the 2020 Summer Olympics had been successful.

Other sports and events
In the 2010–11 season, it was the home stadium for the Real Madrid basketball team. In January 2013, it was the Madrid venue for the 2013 World Men's Handball Championship.

It can also be used for concerts and shows. It was the venue for the 2010 MTV Europe Music Awards held on 7 November of that year.

Gallery

See also
 List of tennis stadiums by capacity
 List of indoor arenas in Spain

References

External links 

 
 Caja Mágica

Indoor arenas in Spain
Tennis venues in Spain
Basketball venues in Spain
Sports venues in Madrid
Sports venues completed in 2009
2009 establishments in Spain
Buildings and structures in Usera District, Madrid